Kyron Nahshon Cartwright (born June 6, 1996) is an American basketball coach and former player. He played college basketball for Providence College and professionally in Europe

Early life and high school
Cartwright was born and raised in Compton, California, where his father serves as the supervisor of the Compton Parks and Recreation Department. He attended Compton High School. As a junior, he posted 12 points and seven assists and was named first team All-Moore League and All-Area by the Daily Breeze and helped lead Compton to a 25–8 record as a senior. Cartwright initially committed to Loyola Marymount, but de-committed and opted for Providence after Loyola coach Max Good was fired.

College career
Cartwright played four seasons for the Providence Friars from 2014 to 2018. He served as back-up behind Kris Dunn as a freshman and became a key reserve and occasional starter as a sophomore before ultimately serving as the Friars' starting point guard during his final two seasons. In his first full season as a starter, Cartwright averaged 11.3 points, 3.5 rebounds and a conference-leading 6.8 assists per game and was named second-team All-Big East and the conference's Most Improved Player. 

At the beginning of his senior season, Cartwright helped propel the Friars to win the 2017 2K Sports Classic and was named the tournament's Most Valuable Player. As a senior, he again led the Big East with 5.8 assists per game and averaged 11.4 points, 3.0 rebounds, and 1.3 steals and was named honorable mention All-Big East. Cartwright was named to the 2018 Big East men's basketball tournament All-Tournament team after averaging 15.7 points, 4.7 assists, and two rebounds per game during Providence's run to the tournament final before ultimately losing Villanova.

Professional career

Alba Fehérvár
Cartwright signed with Alba Fehérvár of the Hungarian Nemzeti Bajnokság I/A (NB I/A) on July 18, 2018, joining Providence teammate Rodney Bullock. Cartwright averaged 9.1 points, 2.5 rebounds, 4.4 assists and 1.4 steals in 13 NB I/A games and 6.8 points, 2.3 rebounds, 4.4 assists and 1.1 steals in nine FIBA Europe Cup games before leaving the team in February 2019.

Leicester Riders
Cartwright signed with the Leicester Riders of the British Basketball League on July 26, 2019.

In his first season with the Riders, Cartwright was an impressive ball-handler. In an early-season game vs the Plymouth Raiders, Cartwright finished with a near all-time basketball high of 19 assists, along with 11 points and 8 rebounds. He averaged 8.6 points, 4.0 rebounds, and 9.1 assists per game.

Phoenix Hagen
On July 26, 2020, Cartwright signed with Phoenix Hagen of the ProA.

References

External links
Providence Friars bio
RealGM Profile
EuroBasket Profile

1996 births
Living people
Alba Fehérvár players
American expatriate basketball people in Germany
American expatriate basketball people in Hungary
American expatriate basketball people in the United Kingdom
American men's basketball players
Basketball players from Compton, California
Compton High School alumni
Leicester Riders players
Phoenix Hagen players
Point guards
Providence Friars men's basketball players